Georg Brysting (30 December 1891 – 26 October 1975) was a Danish footballer who played as a defender for Kjøbenhavns Boldklub. He made 17 appearances for the Denmark national team from 1912 to 1918.

References

External links
 
 

1891 births
1975 deaths
Danish men's footballers
Association football defenders
Denmark international footballers
Kjøbenhavns Boldklub players